John Henry Moellering Sr. (born February 4, 1938) is a retired lieutenant general in the United States Army. He is a 1959 graduate of the United States Military Academy with a B.S. degree in engineering. Moellering also earned an M.S. degree in civil engineering from the University of California, Berkeley in 1962. As a brigadier general, he served as the 59th commandant of the Corps of Cadets at the Military Academy from 1982 to 1984. Moellering served as assistant to the Chairman of the Joint Chiefs of Staff from 1985 until his retirement in 1987.

Personal
Moellering is the son of Robert Charles Moellering Sr. (October 29, 1909 – April 30, 2000) and Irene Pauline (Nolde) Moellering (June 27, 1910 – August 28, 1995). He had two brothers and a sister.

Moellering married Karla Louise Fritzsche on December 21, 1963 in Arlington, Virginia. The couple have two sons and a daughter.

Moellering was selected as a White House Fellow in 1973, serving on the White House Staff.  He was named a Distinguished Graduate of West Point in 2015.  After retiring from the Army, he became President and CEO of Lear Siegler Services, Inc from 1990-2003.  He was also Chairman of USAA 2007-2012.  He is a member of the Adjunct Faculty of Kenan-Flagler Business School at University of North Carolina and serves on the board of RTI, International.

References

1938 births
Living people
People from Fort Wayne, Indiana
United States Military Academy alumni
University of California, Berkeley alumni
United States Army personnel of the Vietnam War
Recipients of the Air Medal
Recipients of the Meritorious Service Medal (United States)
Recipients of the Legion of Merit
United States Army generals
Recipients of the Distinguished Service Medal (US Army)
Recipients of the Defense Distinguished Service Medal